The 1998–1999 English Premiership (called the Allied Dunbar Premiership for sponsorship reasons) was the 12th season of the league at the top of the English rugby union pyramid, the Premiership (rugby union).

This was the second season under the sponsorship of Allied Dunbar.

The league was expanded to include 14 teams instead of 12, with London Scottish, West Hartlepool and Bedford Blues being elected to the premiership. The league commenced on 5 September 1998 and finished on 20 May 1999.

Participating teams 

Notes

Table

* At the end of the 1998–99 season, Richmond and London Scottish were placed into administration and merged with London Irish, and thus did not compete in the subsequent season.

Results

Week 1

Week 2

Week 3

Week 4

Week 5

Week 6

Week 7

Week 7

Week 8

Week 9

Week 10

Week 11

Week 12

Week 13

Week 14

Week 15

Week 16

Week 17

Week 18

Week 19

Week 20

Week 21

Week 22

Week 23

Week 24

Week 25

Week 26

Week 27

Week 28

Week 29

Week 30

Leading scorers
Note: Flags to the left of player names indicate national team as has been defined under World Rugby eligibility rules, or primary nationality for players who did not yet earn international senior caps. Players may hold one or more non-WR nationalities.

Most points 
Source:

Most tries
Source:

Total Season Attendances

External links
 Official site

1998-99
 
England